Perigrapha munda, the twin-spotted Quaker, is a species of moth of the family Noctuidae. The wings are gray, with two closely approximate and very conspicuous dark spots on the disc of the fore wings. a small dark apical mark at the costal edge and a discal spot on the fuscous hindwings. It is found in Palearctic realm (all Europe (absent only in the North and in the South), Russia, and Asia as far east as Japan).

The wingspan is 38–44 mm. The moth flies from March to May depending on the location.

The larvae feed on oak, willow, Populus tremula, Fraxinus excelsior, Acer campestre, Humulus lupulus and honeysuckle.

The nectar-feeding adults visit sallow blossom.

Variation
Perigrapha munda is variable both in colour and markings and there are many named forms. The forewing colouration is from light ochreous brown through to dark ochreous. The stigmata are not well defined and the subterminal line is often faint and reduced to two black median dots. The crosslines are not always well defined in darker forms. The discal spot in the hindwings area is not always clearly defined. There is an isolated subspecies on Taiwan

Habitat
Wooded places- deciduous forests, bushy hedgerows and in gardens and parkland. In the Alps up to a height of maximum 1200 meters.

References

External links
Twin-spotted Quaker at UKmoths
Funet Taxonomy
Lepiforum.de 
Vlindernet.nl 

Orthosiini
Moths described in 1775
Moths of Asia
Moths of Europe
Taxa named by Michael Denis
Taxa named by Ignaz Schiffermüller